The 2018 FIVB Men's Club World Championship was the 14th edition of the tournament. It was held in Poland for the second straight time from 26 November to 2 December 2018. Eight teams competed in the tournament, including four wild cards.

In an all-Italian final Trentino Volley defeated Cucine Lube Civitanova and won the title for the fifth time. Russia's Fakel Novy Urengoy claimed the bronze medal by defeating Poland's Asseco Resovia in the 3rd place match. Aaron Russell from Trentino Volley was elected the Most Valuable Player.

Qualification

* Khatam Ardakan replaced Sarmayeh Bank Tehran (2017 Asian Champions), who dissolved in March 2018.

Pools composition

Squads

Venues

Pool standing procedure
 Number of matches won
 Match points
 Sets ratio
 Points ratio
 If the tie continues as per the points ratio between two teams, the priority will be given to the team which won the last match between them. When the tie in points ratio is between three or more teams, a new classification of these teams in the terms of points 1, 2 and 3 will be made taking into consideration only the matches in which they were opposed to each other.

Match won 3–0 or 3–1: 3 match points for the winner, 0 match points for the loser
Match won 3–2: 2 match points for the winner, 1 match point for the loser

Preliminary round
All times are Central European Time (UTC+01:00).

Pool A

|}

|}

Pool B

|}

|}

Final round
All times are Central European Time (UTC+01:00).

Semifinals

|}

3rd place match

|}

Final

|}

Final standing

Awards

Most Valuable Player
 Aaron Russell (Trentino Volley)
Best Setter
 Simone Giannelli (Trentino Volley)
Best Outside Spikers
 Uroš Kovačević (Trentino Volley)
 Dmitry Volkov (Fakel Novy Urengoy)

Best Middle Blockers
 Robertlandy Simón (Cucine Lube Civitanova)
 Dragan Stanković (Cucine Lube Civitanova)
Best Opposite Spiker
 Tsvetan Sokolov (Cucine Lube Civitanova)
Best Libero
 Jenia Grebennikov (Trentino Volley)

See also
2018 FIVB Volleyball Women's Club World Championship

References

External links
Official website
Final Standing
Awards
Formula
Statistics

FIVB Volleyball Men's Club World Championship
FIVB Men's Club World Championship
International volleyball competitions hosted by Poland
FIVB
FIVB Volleyball
FIVB Volleyball
Sport in Częstochowa
Sport in Płock
Sport in Rzeszów